"Night hunting", known in Bhutan as Bomena, is a traditional "courtship" custom that is practiced in some parts of Bhutan.
Similar customs have also existed in other cultures, namely in Japan.

Practice 
"Night hunting", the traditional culture of nightly courtship and romance that is practiced mostly in eastern and central rural Bhutan. There is neither the word "night" nor the word "hunting" in the original terms. The original words can be best rendered as "Prowling for girls".

Young men go out at night to sneak into girls' windows to engage in sexual activities. The prowling can be solo or in groups depending on whether or not the man has a fixed date. It is the rural equivalent of an urban date. If one has talked with the girl in advance then it can be a solo activity but usually it happens after a gathering when friends decide to go prowling for girls. Most boys would have a girl in mind. Although they set out as a group, they disperse gradually as they find a partner.

Traditional two-story buildings makes the prowling difficult but the sliding window shutter with only wooden latches from inside makes it easier. Strategies vary from sneaking in the door to climbing up the side of a house to enter a window or even dropping in from the roof. The uniform architecture of Bhutanese houses, with same design of doors and windows also make it easier. The age old tradition has also come up with special tools to undo doors and windows. If the boy successfully infiltrates the dwelling, he still may be rejected by the girl he is pursuing. It takes a lot of persuasion especially for the first time. 

The prowling may be foiled due to wrong footing, which may wake up the whole family. They intruder may get chased away with hot water splashed on him, or be thrown out of the window. Strict parents chase the intruder or threaten him with marriage or a stick while liberal ones pretend to be asleep even if they know the prowler is around. This is more likely if they know the prowler is a suitor they would like to have for their daughter. It is not difficult to guess who the prowler might be in small close-knit villages.

Boys generally attempt to complete the task and make a quick exit if the parents of the girl are in and may stay longer if the girl is alone. It is in some places a custom that a boy discovered in the morning by the parents shall become the husband of the girl, but usually the boy  and the girl make sure that the boy exits before the parents get up in the morning. If he oversleeps, they may still find a way to sneak out.

The practice is far more dramatic because this happens under pitch darkness and traditionally the whole family sleep in one large room, which is the kitchen and living room. The prowler must know pretty well where the girl sleeps in order to find the right bed. There are stories of boys getting into the wrong bed and the grannies yelling the boy out or having a good laugh or even quietly enjoying the visit.

The culture of night prowling is fading away due to socio-economic changes. With new metal latches and locks in many houses, it is difficult for young boys now to get into the house. With modern education, modern western form of romance and dating tradition is growing and young people are no longer keen on this traditional practice, preferring to exchange love letters and fix dates. 

There is also a growing perception among urban dwellers unfamiliar with the custom that prowling for girls is tantamount to sexual harassment and often leads to rape. Thus, there are new regulations in place to discourage this practice. Other legal factors include the new paternity law with the penalty of 20% of the income per month until the child is 18 years old for fathering a child.

Issues 
One potential issue is the abuse of this cultural practice leading to sexual assault and rape. Although not the norm, it nevertheless can and has taken place. However, a more common downside of night prowling has been rampant bastardy. Bastardy and single motherhood were less of a problem in the traditional setting with extended families and grandparents always around to look after the child. 

However, the growing culture of nuclear families, the requirement for marriage certificates, requirement of a father to register the child as citizen, the increasing practice of western styled wedding culture are leading to an increased stigma for single motherhood. This subsequently is leading to the fall in sex outside wedlock and practices such as prowling for girls.

Modern education and the literature associated with it are spreading fast and with them a worldview and culture heavily influenced by a Western, Christian moral ethos. This is fast replacing a more "liberal" tantric Buddhist attitude toward sex which was prevalent in Bhutan.

In literature 
In the book “Love, Courtship and Marriage in Rural Bhutan” (2009) by Dorji Penjore, the Centre for Bhutan Studies, discusses night hunting. According to the author, Bomena, a “custom whereby a boy stealthily enters a girl’s house at night for courtship or coitus with or without prior consultation”, is commonly misunderstood in Bhutan as ‘night hunting’. The use of a vernacular word Bomena, not ‘night hunting’, a term loaded with ethnocentrism and ignorance of the custom, tells a lot of this original village ethnography. 

The current discourse and understanding of Bomena, according to the author, are naïve, biased and misrepresented, heavily influenced by changing values especially among the urban societies. One common notion is that any rural culture is ‘inferior’ and all urban cultures are ‘superior’, and replacing the rural culture with urban culture is seen as a way of emancipating the Bhutanese farmers from their ‘primitive’ culture and advancing the country.

See also 
 Yobai, Japan

References

Society of Bhutan
Women in Bhutan